Sexten is a comune in South Tyrol in northern Italy. The village is famous as a summer and winter sport resort in the mountains.

According to the 2011 census, 95.37% of the population speak German, 4.36% Italian and 0.27% Ladin as first language.

Geography
The town sits in a branch of the Puster Valley, near Innichen and Toblach, where the Drava rises. The district borders East Tyrol, Austria, to the north and the border is formed by the Carnic Alps. To the south lie the eponymous Sexten Dolomites and  nature park, which includes the famous Drei Zinnen (Tre Cime di Lavaredo).

The commune is bordered, clockwise from the west, by Toblach, Innichen, Sillian (Austria), Kartitsch (Austria), Comelico Superiore (Belluno) and Auronzo di Cadore, (Belluno).

History
The village's name is of Latin origin: ad horam sexta, meaning "at six-hour", referred to its location south to Innichen. Sexta is documented starting from 965 AD. During World War I, Sexten was on the front line between Italy and the Austro-Hungarian Empire, and suffered much damage.

It was conquered by Italy in November 1918. Later it received further fortifications during the Fascist Era.

It is the hometown of tennis player Jannik Sinner.

Coat-of-arms
The emblem is azure and represents three argent peaks with a sable chamois standing in the centre; the three peaks symbolize the Tre Cime di Lavaredo. The emblem was granted in 1972 but was in use before World War I.

Twin towns
Sexten is twinned with:

  Sankt Veit in Defereggen, Austria
  Zermatt, Switzerland

Notable residents

 Jannik Sinner (born 2001), tennis player

See also 
Sextental

References

External links 

 Homepage of the municipality

lkommen Aktiva Ihre Seite Teilnahme Sehen

Municipalities of South Tyrol